Pwll-y-Pant railway station served the suburb of Pwll-y-Pant, in the historical county of Glamorgan, Wales, from 1871 to 1893 on the Rhymney Railway.

History
The station was opened on 1 April 1871 by the Rhymney Railway. It was known as Pwllypant in Bradshaw.

References

Disused railway stations in Caerphilly County Borough
Railway stations in Great Britain opened in 1871
Railway stations in Great Britain closed in 1893
1871 establishments in Wales
Former Rhymney Railway stations